Tiparos is a Thai fish sauce condiment brand under the Tang Sang Hah Company, established in Chonburi Province in 1919. The company was named "Bowdang", before changing its name in the mid-20th century. The company's founder,  Laichaing Sae Tang, first began to formulate his recipe for fish sauce in 1910. Tiparos is described as a "Thai style" fish sauce, with a different and bolder flavor than Vietnamese styles.

References

External links

Food brands of Thailand
Fish sauces
Food and drink companies established in 1919
1919 establishments in Siam